The 2019–20 Grand Canyon Antelopes men's basketball team represented Grand Canyon University during the 2019–20 NCAA Division I men's basketball season. They were led by head coach Dan Majerle in his seventh season. The Antelopes played their home games at GCU Arena in Phoenix, Arizona as members of the Western Athletic Conference. They finished the season 13–17, 8–8 in WAC play to finish in a tie for fifth place. They were set to be the No. 4 seed in the WAC tournament, however the tournament was canceled amid concerns over the coronavirus pandemic.

On March 13, 2020, the school fired Dan Majerle as head coach of the Antelopes. A few days later, the school named former Vanderbilt and Valparaiso head coach Bryce Drew as the Antelopes' next head coach.

Previous season 
The Antelopes finished the 2018-19 season 20–14, 10–6 in WAC play to finish in third place. They defeated Seattle and Utah Valley to advance to the championship game of the WAC tournament where they lost to New Mexico State. They were invited to the College Basketball Invitational where they lost in the first round to West Virginia.

Roster

Schedule and results

|-
!colspan=12 style=| Exhibition

|-
!colspan=12 style=| Non-Conference Regular Season

|-
!colspan=12 style=| WAC Regular Season

|-
!colspan=12 style=| WAC tournament
|-
!colspan=9 style=|Canceled
|-

Source

References

Grand Canyon Antelopes men's basketball seasons
Grand Canyon
Grand Canyon Antelopes men's basketball
Grand Canyon Antelopes men's basketball